Dasrath Tirkey was a member of the All India Trinamool Congress and won the 2014 Indian general elections from the Alipurduars (Lok Sabha constituency). In 2019, he lost the election.

Three Left Front MLAs, Dasarath Tirkey and Ananta Deb Adhikari of RSP and Sunil Mandal of Forward Bloc joined All India Trinamool Congress in February 2014. He joined Bhartiya Janata party 2020.

While in RSP, Dasrath Tirkey was MLA for three consecutive terms in 2001, 2006 and 2011 elections, from Kumargram assembly seat. He was elected M.P. before he completed his last term as MLA.

References

Living people
India MPs 2014–2019
1967 births
Lok Sabha members from West Bengal
People from Alipurduar
West Bengal MLAs 2001–2006
West Bengal MLAs 2006–2011
West Bengal MLAs 2011–2016
Trinamool Congress politicians from West Bengal
Revolutionary Socialist Party (India) politicians